Mockney (a portmanteau of "mock" and "cockney") is an affected accent and form of speech in imitation of cockney or working-class London speech, or a person with such an accent.  A stereotypical mockney speaker comes from an upper-middle-class background.

A person speaking with a mockney accent might adopt cockney pronunciation but retain standard grammatical forms, whereas the genuine cockney speaker uses non-standard forms (e.g. negative concord).

Details
The first published use of the word according to the Oxford English Dictionary was in 1967.

It is an affectation sometimes adopted for aesthetic or theatrical purposes, and at other times just to sound "cool", to generate street credibility, or to give the false impression that the speaker rose from humble beginnings and became prominent through hard work and some innate talent rather than the education, contacts and other advantages that a privileged background tends to bring. Britpop band  Blur was said to have a "mockney, down-the-dogs blokey charm". Mick Jagger is often accused of being the first celebrity in modern times to overplay his regional accent in order to boost his street credibility.

One explanation of dialect adoption given in social linguistics is the desire for prestige, that a person is likely to adopt speech patterns (including accent, vocabulary, dialect or even language) which they perceive to be prestigious.

The concept of communication accommodation, either upwards or downwards in idiolect, can be seen in many social interactions. One can put someone at ease by speaking in a familiar tone or intonation, or one can intimidate or alienate someone by speaking more formally. For example, in a courtroom, a more formal voice register with technical legal jargon can be used to intimidate a defendant. In contrast, mockney seeks to lower the perceived socio-economic class of the speaker.

Notable people described as using mockney speech
Damon Albarn 
Lily Allen
Russell Brand
Nigel Kennedy
Kate Nash
Tim Roth
Joe Strummer
Jamie Oliver

See also
Class tourism
Mummerset
Received Pronunciation
Sociolinguistics
Mid-Atlantic accent

References

External links
 
 
 Wot’s He Sayin’? British pop reclaims its accent.

English language in England
Pejorative terms for people
English language in London